Barakoni red wine is originated on the steep slopes of the Rioni gorge in the mountainous western region of Racha (modern-day Racha-Lechkhumi and Kvemo Svaneti) in Georgia. This wine, made from Aleksandrouli and Mudzhuretuli grapes (the same grapes from which Khvanchkara is made), is naturally semi-dry.  Barakoni contains 10-12% alcohol, 1.5-2.5% sugar and has 5-7% titrated acidity.

Produced since 1981, Barakoni wine is named after the Georgian Orthodox Barakoni Church of the Mother of God (Georgian: ბარაკონის ღვთისმშობლის ტაძარი), commonly known as Barakoni (ბარაკონი). It is an important surviving example of the medieval tradition of Georgian architecture.

See also 
Georgian wine
Sweetness of wine
List of Georgian wine appellations

References 

Georgian wine